Viktor Prodell (born 29 February 1988) is a Swedish retired footballer who plays as a forward.

Career
On 15 July 2013, he signed a four-year contract with the Belgian side K.V. Mechelen. After joining Elfsborg on loan in 2014, Prodell completed a permanent move to the Allsvenskan club on 7 October 2015. He signed a three-year contract.

On 23 August 2017 he made a clean sheet debut as a goalkeeper in a cup tie against Landskrona BoIS with 30 minutes remaining of extra time after Kevin Stuhr Ellegaard had been sent off and all substitutions had been made.

Personal life
Prodell is half-Finnish.

References

External links

1988 births
Living people
Association football forwards
Eskilstuna City FK players
Åtvidabergs FF players
K.V. Mechelen players
IF Elfsborg players
Allsvenskan players
Superettan players
Belgian Pro League players
Swedish footballers
Sweden international footballers
Swedish expatriate footballers
Expatriate footballers in Belgium
Swedish expatriate sportspeople in Belgium
Expatriate footballers in Vietnam
Swedish expatriate sportspeople in Vietnam
Place of birth missing (living people)
Örebro SK players
Ho Chi Minh City FC players
Västerås SK Fotboll players
Swedish people of Finnish descent